The SIM1, SIM1C, SIM7, and SIM10 bus routes constitute a public transit line in Staten Island and Manhattan, New York. The routes all operate on Richmond Avenue and Hylan Boulevard on Staten Island, but go to three separate terminals in Manhattan. The SIM1 goes to 6th Avenue & Houston Street, the SIM7 goes to 6th Avenue & 14th Street, and the SIM1C and SIM10 go to Central Park South & 6th Avenue. The SIM1, SIM7, and SIM10 operate during the rush hour only. The SIM1C operates 24 hours per day, but does not run in the peak direction during rush hours.

Current route 
All four routes start at the Eltingville Transit Center in Eltingville, Staten Island. They use Richmond Avenue through Eltingville. They then turn left on Hylan Boulevard, passing through the neighborhoods of Great Kills, New Dorp, and Dongan Hills. They then turn right on Narrows Road, before getting on the Verrazzano-Narrows Bridge. They use the Gowanus Expressway and the Brooklyn–Battery Tunnel to get to Manhattan.

The SIM1 uses Battery Place to access the one-way pair of Church Street northbound and Broadway. The route's northern terminus is Houston Street.

The SIM7 exits the tunnel onto West Street. Immediately before the tunnel, southbound buses do a loop on Murray Street, North End Avenue, and Vesey Street to serve World Financial Center. The route continues on West Street, turning east onto Spring Street and then north onto Sixth Avenue. Northbound buses terminate at 14th Street and Sixth Avenue. Southbound buses originate at 13th Street and Broadway, then continue south on Broadway until they turn west onto Houston Street. At West Street, southbound SIM7 buses follow the northbound route to the Battery Tunnel.

The SIM10 operates through the Battery Park Underpass to access the FDR Drive, turning west at 23rd Street and north onto Sixth Avenue. It terminates at 59th Street. Southbound, the SIM10 uses Fifth Avenue, 23rd Street, and the FDR Drive to the Battery Tunnel.

The SIM1C follows the SIM1's route, then uses Sixth Avenue northbound to 23rd Street, before following the SIM10's route to 59th Street. Southbound, the SIM1C follows the SIM10 to 23rd Street, then uses Fifth Avenue and Broadway to the Battery Tunnel.

History 
These routes replaced the X1, X2, X3, X4, X5, X7, X8, and X9 routes in the Staten Island Bus Redesign. The SIM1 was extended to Houston Street on January 13, 2019. The SIM10 has had multiple trips added, it operates from 2:00PM to 6:40PM leaving Manhattan, and from 4:10AM to 8:10AM leaving Staten Island.

Equipment 
The SIM1, SIM7, SIM10, and SIM1C are based at Yukon Depot. They use Yukon's fleet of 2015-16 Prévost X3-45 buses. Prior to 2015, they also used MCI 102DLW3SS buses, but these were retired by the Prévosts.  Additionally, they used Yukon’s fleet of 2002 MCI D4500 buses until 2021.

While being based at Yukon Depot, the SIM1, SIM1C, SIM7, and SIM10 sometimes use buses loaned from Castleton, Charleston, and Meredith Depots.

Gallery

References 

Bus routes in Staten Island 
Bus transportation in New York City
MTA Regional Bus routes